Alfred William Madison Cooper (born 12 June 1932) is a former Irish and American international cricketer. A right-handed batsman and right-arm fast-medium bowler, he played twice for Ireland, a first-class match against the MCC in September 1954 after making his debut against Lancashire earlier in the year. He later represented the USA national team, playing for them on a tour to England in 1968.

References

1932 births
Living people
Irish cricketers
American cricketers
Cricketers from County Dublin